Ralph Shore (died 1430/1), of Derby, was an English politician.

He was a Member (MP) of the Parliament of England for Derby in 1419, May 1421, December 1421 and 1423.

References

Year of birth missing
1430 deaths
English MPs 1419
English MPs May 1421
English MPs December 1421
English MPs 1423
15th-century English politicians
Politicians from Derby